The  is an electric multiple unit (EMU) commuter train type operated by the private railway operator Kintetsu Railway since 2000.

Background 
The 3220 series is the first member of Kintetsu's  commuter train lineup, the concept of which was to be a human-friendly, environmentally conscious, and reduced-cost train that was intended to "set the standard for the 21st century". The 3220 series was designed for use on Karasuma Subway Line inter-running services, and like the 3200 series trains that are also used on these services, feature left-offset front-end emergency exits. Kintetsu has since introduced further Series 21 variants, including the two-car 9020 series; the six-car 5820 series, which features rotating transverse seating; and the 6820 series, which operates on the narrow-gauge Minami Osaka Line.

Operations 
Entering service on 15 March 2000, the 3220 series sets mainly operate on Kyoto Line services, including through-running to and from the Karasuma Subway Line. Operation is limited to east of Sakuragawa Station on Nara/Namba line services as the trains lack the safety devices required on the Hanshin Line.

Formations 
, the fleet consists of three six-car sets, with all sets based at Saidaiji Depot mainly for Kyoto Line services. The sets are formed with three motored (M) cars and three non-powered trailer (T) cars, and the 3720 car at the Namba/Kyoto end.

The Mo 3220 car is fitted with two cross-arm pantographs while the rest of the M cars are fitted with one single-arm pantograph.

Special liveries 
Since their introduction into service, 3220 series sets KL22 and KL23 were wrapped in a "Kyoto-Nara" livery to promote the commencement of through services onto the Karasuma Subway Line. Set KL22 carried the livery until April 2011, and set KL23 until July of that year.

Gallery

See also 

 Kintetsu 5820 series, a similar 6-car derivative capable of rotating seat formations
 Kintetsu 6820 series, a narrow-gauge 2-car derivative of the 9020 series
 Kintetsu 9020 series, similar two-car sets
 Kintetsu 9820 series, similar six-car sets with permanent longitudinal seating throughout

References

External links 

 Kintetsu "Series 21" (3220/5820/9020/9820/6820 series) train information 

Electric multiple units of Japan
3220 series
Train-related introductions in 2000

Kinki Sharyo multiple units
1500 V DC multiple units of Japan